Shogun's Samurai, known in Japan as , is a 1978 Japanese historical martial arts period film directed by Kinji Fukasaku. The film is the first of two period films by Fukasaku starring Shinichi "Sonny" Chiba as Jūbei Mitsuyoshi Yagyū, the other being Samurai Reincarnation.

The film was adapted into a 39-episode TV series, The Yagyu Conspiracy (1978–1979), and two TV film remakes were released in 2008 and 2020.

Plot

In 1624, shogun Tokugawa Hidetada of the Tokugawa shogunate dies at Edo Castle. Komuro Kihei, his taster, also kills himself, leading to suspicion that the shogun was poisoned. Hidetada's oldest son Iemitsu was to be heir, but his father disliked his appearance and stammer and preferred his second son Tadanaga, who is bright, handsome, and admired. Hidetada's wife Oeyo uses her influence on other ministers such as the lord of Owari, Chief Chamberlain Doi, and Councilor Sakai, who join her in backing Tadanaga as heir. The young Chamberlain Matsudaira and Lady Kasuga, leader of the harem, back Iemitsu. The scheming nobles Sanjo Saneeda and Karasuma Ayamaro hope for the downfall of the government altogether.

Ninjas hired by Doi enter the shogun's tomb in Zojo Temple and cut out his heart, but it is stolen from them by Yagyu's daughter Akane. Yagyu, Iemitsu's fencing instructor, determines that Hidetada was poisoned and confronts Chamberlain Matsudaira and Lady Kasuga. Matudaira ends up admitting to Iemitsu that he poisoned Hidetada and Yagyu explains that Kihei put arsenic in his father's food for three days to poison him.

The lovers Hayate and Mon become independent Negoro fighters attempting to reclaim their homeland in Yamato Province that was taken 20 years earlier. They receive a request, ostensibly from Tadanaga, to aid the young prince. Jubei returns just as they resolve to aid the prince and he helps them kill Koga ninja spies in the woods. Doi tells Tadanaga that his father was poisoned by Iemitsu's retainers and Tadanaga confronts Iemitsu about it but Matsudaira and Lady Kasuga deny it and Iemitsu refuses to allow the body to be examined. Tadanaga invites his mother to move with him to his large estate in Suruga. Akane and her brothers meet with their brother Jubei and the Negoro fighters at the Tama River on the outskirts of Edo. Yagyu asks Sagenta, leader of the Negoro, to let the new female fighter Mon work for him.

Doi resigns his office, complaining that he is ill. Iemitsu assigns Matsudaira as Chief Chamberlain, Yagyu as Inspector General, and shuffles his cabinet to deal with his brother's potential attempt to seize the shogunate. The nobles in Kyoto will not appoint a new shogun and refuse to take a side, forcing the brothers to resolve the matter between themselves. Bekki Shōzaemon, commander of Suruga, cuts down the Negoro banners that the warriors have set up. Lord Date in Sendai offers to help Tadanaga and sends his daughter for him to marry. Doi helps Tadanaga gather the support of various powerful lords. Ogasawara Genshinsai, a fighter as famous as Yagyu, also agrees to help Tadanaga in exchange for being appointed his fencing instructor once Tadanaga becomes shogun.

The Negoro warriors and the Yagyu siblings attack Doi at night but Karasuma Ayamaro stops them and kills one of Yagyu's sons. Yagyu sends Mon to work in Lady Kasuga's harem to guard Prince Iemitsu. Genshinsai visits and challenges Yagyu, who claims that he cannot fight because he is the prince's fencing instructor, then draws his sword and cuts through the wall behind him where Jubei is hiding, cutting his face and blinding him in his left eye. Jubei also manages to injure Genshinsai's hand before he flees. Genshinsai seeks out the help of his old apprentice Yukinojo, who is now working as a kabuki performer. Yukinojo dresses as a handmaiden and attacks Iemitsu. Mon jumps in front of the weapon and saves his life but sustains a moderate injury. Hayate sneaks into her room at night and brings her some medicine for her wound.

The Yagyu siblings and Negoro warriors attack Tadanaga on Minobu Road. Sagenta, leader of the Negoro, and Akane are killed during the battle. Yagyu sends Jubei to Kyoto to eliminate the troublesome nobles. Jubei kills Lord Ayamaro. Sanjo Saneeda meets with Yagyu, who accuses him of orchestrating disputes in an attempt to fight Tokugawa and restore imperial control.

Iemitsu plans to apologize to the emperor in Kyoto in exchange for being appointed as the new shogun, but Tadanaga learns of this and heads to Kyoto himself to reach the emperor first. Rifles are sent to the Negoro warrior with instructions to attack on Iemitsu at Kisei River on the morning of November 8, 1624, but they find the litter empty and realize that it is a trap, whereupon they are fired upon by waiting riflemen. Amano Gyobu kills the envoy Sanjo but is shot and left for dead. Tadanaga is informed of the attack and realizes that it was set up by Iemitsu, so he turns back.

Following Yagyu's advice, Iemitsu sends letters to the lords denouncing Tadanaga for the attack in order to gain their aid in his attack on Tadanaga. All of the lords side with Iemitsu, even Lord Date, who refuses to send his daughter to marry Tadanaga. Iemitsu has Lord Ando occupy Sunpu Castle, Tadanaga's estate. Tadanaga decides to surrender in order to spare the lives of his men, but his retainer Bekki refuses to surrender and charges at Ando's men, only to be shot dead. Tadanaga surrenders and is exiled to Takasaki. Jubei becomes a wandering ronin.

Okuni visits the lord of Owari at Nagoya Castle to dance for him. Sanza, who was blinded in the attack on Iemitsu, explains to the lord that the attack was a trick orchestrated on Iemitsu's behalf and the Negoro had never truly been working for Tadanaga. Yagyu brings orders from Iemitsu that Tadanaka is to perform seppuku, which he does. Most of the Negoro are slaughtered on their land by imperial soldiers. Sanza kills Okuni at her request. Genshinsai arrives and challenges Yagyu but is defeated and killed. Yubei finds the slaughtered Negoro, including his own children, and Hayate and Mon explain that the soldiers were led by the traitor Matajuro.

Iemitsu is appointed shogun. He tells his dead father that he has no regrets and sends Yagyu a message that the Yagyu Shikage school shall continue. Jubei beheads Iemitsu and throws his head at Yagyu's feet, then chops off Yagyu's right hand. Yagyu wanders away holding the head in his remaining hand, insisting that it must be a dream.

Cast

Release
In May 2022, Discotek Media announced they licensed the film in North America under their new Nihon Nights imprint. They will release it on Blu-ray on September 27, 2022 as Shogun's Samurai: The Yagyu Clan Conspiracy.

Accolades
The film received five Japan Academy Prize nominations, including best actor (Kinnosuke Yorozuya), best art direction (Norimichi Ikawa), best film, best screenplay (Kinji Fukasaku, Tatsuo Nogami, Hirō Matsuda), and best supporting actor (Shinichi Chiba).

Adaptations
The film was adapted into a teleplay called The Yagyu Conspiracy which was broadcast by Kansai Telecasting Corporation for 39 one-hour TV episodes from 1978 to 1979. A TV movie remake starring Takaya Kamikawa as Jūbei and Hiroki Matsukata as Munenori aired on TV Asahi on September 28, 2008. A second TV movie remake starring Kōtarō Yoshida as Munenori and Junpei Mizobata as Jūbei aired on NHK BS Premium on April 11, 2020.

References

External links

1978 films
Films about assassinations
Films directed by Kinji Fukasaku
Films set in 1624
Films set in Edo
Films set in the Edo period
Films set in Kyoto
Films set in Nara Prefecture
Films set in Shizuoka Prefecture
1970s Japanese-language films
Jidaigeki films
Samurai films
Cultural depictions of Yagyū clan
Cultural depictions of Tokugawa Iemitsu
1970s Japanese films